Matthew Bright (born June 8, 1952) is a former film director, writer and actor.

His first credits were as writer and actor in Richard Elfman's 1980 film Forbidden Zone, portraying the twins Squeezit and René Henderson. The film includes his two sado-masochistic characters living in a garbage can, spit on, raped and tortured in an alternate dimension's kingdom and decapitated by Satan (played by Bright's real-life childhood best friend, composer Danny Elfman).

Bright is notable for writing and directing the 1996 exploitation film Freeway and its 1999 direct-to-video sequel.

In his last work, Tiptoes, Bright's original 150-minute cut, was reduced to 90 minutes by his producers without his consent, leading to Bright to vocally criticise the producers on stage. Following the re-edited cut's negative reception, Bright has not directed another film as of 2022.

Filmography
 Forbidden Zone, writer/actor (1980)
 Wildfire, writer (1988)
 Guncrazy, writer (1992)
 Dark Angel: The Ascent, writer (1994)
 Shrunken Heads, writer (1994)
 Freeway, writer/director (1996)
 Modern Vampires, writer (1998)
 Freeway II: Confessions of a Trickbaby, writer/director (1999)
 Ted Bundy, writer/director (2002)
Schwaz, writer/director (2002)
 Tiptoes, writer/director (2003)

References

External links

American film directors
1952 births
Living people